Boualem Rahoui (born 8 October 1948 in Aïn Témouchent) is a retired Algerian long-distance runner. He specialized in the 3000 metres steeplechase, 5000 metres and 10,000 metres.

Career
Rahoui represented the club ASPTT Oran. He competed in the steeplechase and the 5000 metres at the 1972 Olympic Games, and the 10,000 metres at the 1983 World Championships. At the 1975 Mediterranean Games he won the steeplechase gold and the 10,000 metres bronze, and he also won three gold medals at the Maghreb Championships.

His personal best times were 8.20.2 minutes in the steeplechase, achieved in 1975; and 13.40.2 minutes in the 5000 metres, achieved in 1975.

References

1948 births
Living people
People from Aïn Témouchent
Algerian male long-distance runners
Algerian male steeplechase runners
Athletes (track and field) at the 1972 Summer Olympics
Olympic athletes of Algeria
Athletes (track and field) at the 1975 Mediterranean Games
Mediterranean Games gold medalists for Algeria
Mediterranean Games bronze medalists for Algeria
World Athletics Championships athletes for Algeria
Mediterranean Games medalists in athletics
21st-century Algerian people
20th-century Algerian people